The obsessive–compulsive spectrum is a model of medical classification where various psychiatric, neurological and/or medical conditions are described as existing on a spectrum of conditions related to obsessive–compulsive disorder (OCD). "The disorders are thought to lie on a spectrum from impulsive to compulsive where impulsivity is said to persist due to deficits in the ability to inhibit repetitive behavior with known negative consequences, while compulsivity persists as a consequence of deficits in recognizing completion of tasks." OCD is a mental disorder characterized by obsessions and/or compulsions. An obsession is defined as "a recurring thought, image, or urge that the individual cannot control". Compulsion can be described as a "ritualistic behavior that the person feels compelled to perform". The model suggests that many conditions overlap with OCD in symptomatic profile, demographics, family history, neurobiology, comorbidity, clinical course and response to various pharmacotherapies. Conditions described as being on the spectrum are sometimes referred to as obsessive–compulsive spectrum disorders.

Conditions
The following conditions have been hypothesized by various researchers as existing on the spectrum.

However, recently there is a growing support for proposals to narrow down this spectrum to only include body dysmorphic disorder, hypochondriasis, tic disorders, and body focused repetitive behaviors.

Body dysmorphic disorder

Body dysmorphic disorder is defined by an obsession with an imagined defect in physical appearance, and compulsive rituals in an attempt to conceal the perceived defect. Typical complaints include perceived facial flaws, perceived deformities of body parts and body size abnormalities. Some compulsive behaviors observed include mirror checking, ritualized application of makeup to hide the perceived flaw, excessive hair combing or cutting, excessive physician visits and plastic surgery. Body dysmorphic disorder is not gender specific and onset usually occurs in teens and young adults.

Hypochondriasis

Hypochondriasis is excessive preoccupancy or worry about having a serious illness. These thoughts cause a person a great deal of anxiety and stress. The prevalence of this disorder is the same for men and women. Hypochondriasis is normally recognized in early adult age. Those with hypochondriasis are constantly thinking of their body functions, minor bumps and bruises as well as body images. Hypochondriacs go to numerous outpatient facilities for confirmation of their own diagnosis. Hypochondriasis is the belief that something is wrong but it is not known to be a delusion.

Tic disorders
Tourette's syndrome is a neurological disorder characterized by recurrent involuntary movements (motor tics) and involuntary noises (vocal tics). The reason Tourette's syndrome and other tic disorders are being considered for placement in the obsessive compulsive spectrum is because of the phenomenology and co-morbidity of the disorders with obsessive compulsive disorder. Within the population of patients with OCD up to 40% have a history of a tic disorder and 60% of people with Tourette's syndrome have obsessions and/or compulsions. Plus 30% of people with Tourette's syndrome have clinically diagnosable OCD. Course of illness is another factor that suggests correlation because it has been found that tics displayed in childhood are a predictor of obsessive and compulsive symptoms in late adolescence and early adulthood. However, the association of Tourette's and tic disorders with OCD is challenged by neuropsychology and pharmaceutical treatment. Whereas OCD is treated with SSRI, tics are treated with dopamine blockers and alpha-2 agonists.

Trichotillomania
Trichotillomania is an impulse control disorder which causes an individual to pull out their hair from various parts of their body without a purpose. The cause for trichotillomania remains unknown. Like OCD, trichotillomania is not a nervous condition but stress can trigger this habit. For some people pulling their hair out of boredom is normal, but that is not the case for someone that is dealing with trichotillomania. Emotions do not affect the behavior but these behaviors are more prevalent in those with depression. Review articles recommend behavioral interventions such as habit reversal training and decoupling.

References

Sources

Spectrum disorders
Stress-related disorders
Obsessive–compulsive disorder